Isfossnipa Peak is a peak  southeast of Austvorren Ridge, surmounting the eastern part of the Neumayer Cliffs in Queen Maud Land, Antarctica. It was photographed from the air by the Third German Antarctic Expedition (1938–39). It was mapped by Norwegian cartographers from surveys and air photos by the Norwegian–British–Swedish Antarctic Expedition (1949–1952), led by John Schjelderup Giæver, and from air photos by the Norwegian expedition (1958–59) and named "Isfossnipa" (the icefall peak).

References

Mountains of Queen Maud Land
Princess Martha Coast